"Let us break bread together"  is a traditional Christian hymn. Its melody is searching, simple, major key, and has simple lyrics.

"Let us break bread together" follows in the tradition of most Black spirituals. Black spirituals were mostly composed by African slaves who had no training in western music. The tune varied but became known widely after publication in The Second Book of Negro Spirituals in 1926.

Mentions in the Bible 
"Breaking bread" is mentioned 21 times in the Christian Bible:

The hymn's roots

In the Canterbury Dictionary of Hymnology, written by United Methodist Hymnal editor, Dr. Carlton Young, suggests that this "spiritual was formed in the West African Gullah/Geechee slave culture that developed in the costal areas of South-Eastern colonial America, including St Helena Island, Beaufort, and Charleston, South Carolina ..."

The hymn

American slaves could communicate the intention of escaping by singing "Let us break bread together" It is a hymn of the Underground Railroad.

The hymn is common in holy communion services, reminding us of our spiritual food and drink presented through the bread and wine. The hymn or spiritual is popular among young people, as on acoustic guitar it is easy to accompany. It has gradually found acceptance among older Christians as well. This is clearly shown by its inclusion in many hymn books and albums such as the late 1970s The Old Rugged Cross by the respected gospel singer George Beverly Shea.

Let us break bread together and the Catholic church

The hymn is frequently sung at Holy Communion time in Black Catholic churches and elsewhere, and is number 135 in Lead Me, Guide Me, the first hymnal ever commissioned for the use of Black Catholics. It was not included in the second edition of the hymnal, however, and in 2020 the United States Conference of Catholic Bishops questioned the song's theology and recommended it not be used.

Lyrics

Lyrics are public domain.

References

External links

 The University of Pittsburgh on the hymn
 Music, for guitar
 Google Books on the hymn
 Music, for keyboard instruments
 Jessye Norman performs Let Us Break Bread Together on Youtube
 Joan Baez performs Let Us Break Bread Together on Youtube

American Christian hymns
African-American spiritual songs
African-American music